Redhakhol is a town and a notified area council in Sambalpur district in the Indian state of Odisha.It has the following banks: Canara Bank, DCB Bank, State Bank of India, Union Bank, Utkal Gramin Bank, and Central Bank. Redhakhol town, which is the Sub-Divisional headquarter of Rairakhol Sub-division and surrounded by a green belt of reserve forest, is unique for its natural environment and pollution-free status. The town is 67 K.M. from Sambalpur and 260 K.M. from Bhubaneswar. Sambalpur-Cuttack the old National Highway 42 now renamed as National Highway 55 is passing through this town. After the opening of the Kiakata bridge on Rairakhol-Kiakata State Highway, this town has become a junction point, as it opens easy & straight communication to Phulbani & Berhampur. The historical Deogarh town is situated to its North & is connected by 88 K.M. length of Blacktopping road leading to Ranchi Vijayawada Highway.

The town has earned its name for economical value as people from nearby villages adjunct to the town depends upon it for selling off their Agricultural and Forest products and purchasing of their daily needs. Moreover the Sub-divisional hospital is situated in the town. All the passengers buses plying through this town make a temporary halts for the passenger take meal, tiffin and drinking water.

Geography

History

During the British Raj era, Rairakhol was the capital of Rairakhol State, one of the several princely states of the Eastern States Agency. It had been a feudatory state to Bamra until the 18th century.

Location
National Highway 55 passes through Redhakhol. It is around 67 km south of Sambalpur, the district headquarters.

Demographics
 India census, Redhakhol had a population of 13,722. Males constitute 53% of the population and females 47%. Redhakhol has an average literacy rate of 66%, higher than the national average of 59.5%: male literacy is 76%, and female literacy is 55%. In Redhakhol, 14% of the population is under 6 years of age.

References

External links
 Redhakhol
 Notified Area Council, Redhakhol

Cities and towns in Sambalpur district